The Lower Red Lion is a public house at 34 and 36 Fishpool Street in St Albans, Hertfordshire, England. The building is seventeenth century and is designated Grade II with Historic England.

References 

Pubs in St Albans
Grade II listed pubs in Hertfordshire